was a Japanese general. He was 71 when he died.

Life
Hongo Fusataro fought at Chinchow, Teilishih and Liiao-yuan in the Russo-Japanese War in 1904-05. During this time he was promoted to major general (1905) and to lieutenant general (1912). Hongo Fusataro was also War Vice-Minister and Commander-in-Chief of the Japanese Forces in Tsingtao. Fusataro was then made a full general and a member of the Military Council in 1918.

Japanese generals
1860 births
1931 deaths
Military personnel from Hyōgo Prefecture
People from Hyōgo Prefecture